Gabriel Lippmann conceived a two-step method to record and reproduce colours, variously known as direct photochromes, interference photochromes, Lippmann photochromes, Photography in natural colours by direct exposure in the camera or the Lippmann process of colour photography. Lippmann won the Nobel Prize in Physics for this work in 1908.

A Lippmann plate is a clear glass plate (having no anti-halation backing), coated with an almost transparent (very low silver halide content) emulsion of extremely fine grains, typically 0.01 to 0.04 micrometres in diameter.
Consequently, Lippmann plates have an extremely high resolving power exceeding 400 lines/mm.

Method
In Lippmann's method, a glass plate is coated with an ultra fine grain colour-sensitive film using the Albumen Process containing potassium bromide, then dried, sensitized in the silver bath, washed, irrigated with cyanine solution, and dried again. The back of the film is then brought into optical contact with a reflective surface. This is done by mounting the plate in a specialized holder with pure mercury behind the film. When it is exposed in the camera through the glass side of the plate, the light rays which strike the transparent light-sensitive film are reflected back on themselves and, by interference, create standing waves. The standing waves cause exposure of the emulsion in diffraction patterns. The developed and fixated diffraction patterns constitute a Bragg condition in which diffuse, white light is scattered in a specular fashion and undergoes constructive interference in accordance to Bragg's law. The result is an image having very similar colours as the original using a black and white photographic process.

For this method Lippmann won the Nobel Prize in Physics in 1908.

The colour image can only be viewed in the reflection of a diffuse light source from the plate, making the field of view limited, and it cannot be copied. The technique was very insensitive with the emulsions of the time and it never came into general use. Another reason Lippmann's process of colour photography did not succeed can be found in the invention of the autochrome plates by the Lumière brothers. Lippmann photographic techniques have been proposed as a method of producing images which can easily be viewed, but not copied, for security purposes.

Other sources of Lippmann plates

 The Kodak Spectroscopic Plate Type 649-F is specified with a resolving power of 2000 lines/mm.
 A diffusion method for making silver bromide based holographic recording material

References

External links
Lippmann Wiki for experimenters
Forum for the Lippmann Process

Photographic processes